A single human poll represents the 1978–79 AIAW Division I women's basketball rankings, the AP Poll, in addition to various publications' preseason polls. 

he AP poll was initially a poll of coaches conducted via telephone, where coaches identified top teams and a list of the Top 20 team was produced. The contributors continued to be coaches until 1994, when the AP took over administration of the poll from Mel Greenberg, and switched to a panel of writers.

The AP poll is currently a poll of sportswriters. The AP conducts polls weekly through the end of the regular season and conference play.

Legend

AP Poll
Source

References

College women's basketball rankings in the United States